Hancock may refer to:

Places

Places in the United States
 Hancock, Iowa
 Hancock, Maine
 Hancock, Maryland
 Hancock, Massachusetts
 Hancock, Michigan
 Hancock, Minnesota
 Hancock, Missouri
 Hancock, New Hampshire
 Hancock (CDP), New Hampshire
 Hancock, New York, a town
 Hancock (village), New York, in the town of Hancock
 Hancock, Austin, Texas, a neighborhood
 Hancock, Vermont
 Hancock (town), Wisconsin
 Hancock, Wisconsin, a village within the town
 Hancock County (disambiguation), a list of counties in ten U.S. states
 Hancock Township (disambiguation)
 Mount Hancock (disambiguation)
 Hancock Park, Los Angeles, California

Facilities and structures
 Great North Museum: Hancock, formerly the Hancock Museum, a natural history museum in Newcastle upon Tyne, England
 John Hancock Center, a Chicago skyscraper owned by the financial company of the same name
 John Hancock Tower, a building in Boston, Massachusetts, also owned by the company
 Syracuse Hancock International Airport

People
 Hancock (surname), with list of people with the surname

Entertainment
 Hancock (film), a 2008 superhero film starring Will Smith
 Hancock's Half Hour, a British BBC radio and TV comedy programme, eventually shortened to Hancock
 Hancock (1963 TV series), a 1963 British ITV television series
 Hancock, a 1991 Screen One episode about Tony Hancock

Other uses
 Hancock (programming language)
Signature
Named after John Hancock, American patriot
 Hancock air whistle, a whistle intended for use on diesel locomotives
 John Hancock Financial, a US company
 USS Hancock, the name of several ships belonging to the United States Navy

See also